Marcell or Marczell Nemes (4 May 1866, in Jánoshalma – 28 October 1930, in Budapest) was a Hungarian financier, art collector and art dealer. He was born Moses Klein.

Bibliography

 István Németh: Von El Greco zu den französischen Expressionisten: Die Ausstellung der Sammlung von Marczell von Nemes in Budapest, München und Düsseldorf. in: Beat Wismer: El Greco und die Moderne. Museum Kunstpalast, Düsseldorf, 28. April - 12. August 2012. Ostfildern  : Hatje Cantz, 2012 , S. 386-393
 István Németh: Der Greco-Sammler Marczell von Nemes  und die deutschen Museen, in: Matthias Weniger (Hrsg.): Greco, Velazquez, Goya. Spanische Malerei aus deutschen Sammlungen.  München, Prestel 2005
 Veronika Schroeder: Spanien und die Moderne - Marczell von Nemes, Julius Meier-Graefe, Hugo Tschudi. in: Manet bis van Gogh  : Hugo von Tschudi und der Kampf um die Moderne. München : Prestel, 1996 , S. 419-423
 Veronika Schroeder: El Greco im frühen deutschen Expressionismus  : von der Kunstgeschichte als Stilgeschichte zur Kunstgeschichte als Geistesgeschichte. Frankfurt am Main [u.a.]  : Lang, 1998   Diss. München 1996
 Sammlung Marczell von Nemes: Gemälde, Skulpturen, Textilen, Kunstgewerbe. Auktionskatalog. Auktionsleitung: Mensing & Sohn / Cassirer / Helbing. München 1931.  München: Verl. Helbing 1931. Geleitwort von Max J. Friedländer
 Simon Meller: Marczell von Nemes, in: Zeitschrift für Bildenden Kunst, Leipzig, 1931–32, Nr. 65, S. 25-30
 Paul Schubring: Die Sammlung Nemes in Budapest, in: Zeitschrift für Bildende Kunst 22(1910–11) 28-38
 Gabriel von Térey: Die Sammlung Marcell von Nemes in Budapest, in: Kunst und Künstler 9 (1911) 217-224
 Gabriel von Térey: Die Greco-Bilder der Sammlung Nemes, in: Der Cicerone 3 (1911) 1-6
 Katalog der aus der Sammlung des Kgl. Rates Marczell von Nemes - Budapest ausgestellte Gemälde, Alte Pinakothek, München 1911.
 Katalog der aus der Sammlung des Kgl. Rates Marczell von Nemes - Budapest ausgestellte Gemälde, Städtische Kunsthalle, Düsseldorf 1912.

External links 

 Marcell Nemes biographische Übersicht bei hupont (hu)
 Konstantin Akinsha: Lunching under the Goya. Jewish Collectors in Budapest at the Beginning of the Twentieth Century, in:  Quest, Oktober 2011
 Collection Marczell de Nemes de Budapest, preface par M. Roger-Miles. Galerie Manzi, Joyant, Paris 1913. Auktionskatalog

1866 births
1930 deaths
Hungarian art collectors
Hungarian art dealers
Hungarian Jews
Jewish art collectors